Kastrat is a former municipality in the Shkodër County, northwestern Albania. At the 2015 local government reform it became a subdivision of the municipality Malësi e Madhe. The population at the 2011 census was 6,883.

Name
Its name contains the Albanian suffix -at, widely used to form toponyms from personal names and surnames.

Settlements 
There are 12 settlements within Kastrat, of which Bajzë maintains city status.

 Marshej
 Bajzë
 Bratosh
 Goraj
 Gradec
 Hot
 Ivanaj
 Jeran
 Kastrat
 Pjetroshan
 Rrapshë
 Vukpalaj
 Rrogom

See also
 Kastrati
 Kastrati (tribe)

References

 
Former municipalities in Shkodër County
Administrative units of Malësi e Madhe